Holiday for Henrietta is a 1952 French comedy film directed by Julien Duvivier, and starring Dany Robin, Michel Auclair, and Hildegard Knef.

Background
While urgently trying to develop a screenplay for a new film, two screenwriters, the downbeat Crèmieux and the optimist Seignier, create contradictory storylines as they argue, and as each takes turns in taking the narrative forward, they force the lead characters Henriette et Maurice into weird situations. The film switches back and forth between the writers at home and the film as it develops according to their ideas.

The film's sets were designed by the art director Jean d'Eaubonne. It was shot at the Billancourt Studios and on location around Paris including at the Gaumont-Palace cinema.

Holiday for Henrietta was remade in English as the 1964 film Paris When It Sizzles, starring William Holden and Audrey Hepburn, which also featured d'Eaubonne as art director.

Cast
 Dany Robin as Henriette
 Michel Auclair as Marcel
 Hildegard Knef as Rita Solar
 Louis Seigner as script writer
 Micheline Francey as Nicole, script girl
 Henri Crémieux as script writer
 Michel Roux as Robert
 Daniel Ivernel as detective
 Odette Laure as Valentine
 Jeannette Batti as Gisèle
 Liliane Maigné as the cigarette girl
 Geneviève Morel as The Concierge

References

Bibliography
 Crisp, Colin. French Cinema—A Critical Filmography: Volume 2, 1940–1958. Indiana University Press, 2015.

External links

1952 comedy films
1952 films
Films directed by Julien Duvivier
French comedy films
1950s French-language films
Films about screenwriters
French black-and-white films
Films shot at Billancourt Studios
Films shot in Paris
Films set in Paris
1950s French films